Beauworth is a village and civil parish in the City of Winchester district of Hampshire, England, about eight miles east of Winchester.  As of 2013, Beauworth has a small population of 97. It is in the civil parish of Cheriton.

On Sunday afternoon 30 June 1833, four boys playing on a small piece of pasture land discovered what became known as the Beauworth Hoard.The Beauworth Hoard is believed to be linked to the very powerful Walkelin.

References

External links

Villages in Hampshire